Harvey R. Kenton (born 1940/1941) is an American politician. He was a Republican member of the Delaware House of Representatives from 2011 to 2019, representing District 36.

Career and education
After graduating from high school, Kenton enlisted in the United States Navy.  He worked in agriculture for decades before being elected to the Delaware House of Representatives in 2010.

In June 2021, at the age of 80, Kenton earned an associate degree in applied science for production agriculture from Delaware Technical Community College, also winning the Outstanding Graduate Award.

Electoral history
In 2010, Kenton won the general election with 5,229 votes (54.3%) against Democratic nominee C. Russell McCabe to replace retiring Republican V. George Carey.
In 2012, Kenton was unopposed in the general election, winning 6,298 votes.
In 2014, Kenton was unopposed in the general election, winning 4,455 votes.
In 2016, Kenton was unopposed in the general election, winning 7,175 votes.

References

External links
Official page at the Delaware General Assembly
Campaign site
 

Place of birth missing (living people)
Year of birth missing (living people)
1940s births
Living people
Republican Party members of the Delaware House of Representatives
21st-century American politicians
People from Milford, Delaware